Phil Yannik Neumann (born 8 July 1997) is a German professional footballer who plays as a right-back for Hannover 96 in the 2. Bundesliga.

Career
In June 2019, 2. Bundesliga side Holstein Kiel announced the signing of Neumann from FC Ingolstadt 04, which was relegated to the 3. Liga.

References

1997 births
Living people
German footballers
Association football defenders
FC Ingolstadt 04 players
Holstein Kiel players
Hannover 96 players
2. Bundesliga players
Regionalliga players
People from Recklinghausen
Sportspeople from Münster (region)
Footballers from North Rhine-Westphalia